Rolf Thiele (7 March 1918 – 9 October 1994) was a German film director, producer and screenwriter. He directed 42 films between 1951 and 1977. He was born in Prödlitz, then in the Austro-Hungarian Empire. His 1958 film Eva was entered into the 1959 Cannes Film Festival. His 1964 film Tonio Kröger was entered into the 14th Berlin International Film Festival.

Selected filmography

  Keepers of the Night (1949, dir. Harald Braun)
 A Day Will Come (1950, dir. Rudolf Jugert)
  (1951)
 The Day Before the Wedding (1952)
 Beloved Life (1953)
 His Royal Highness (1953, dir. Harald Braun)
 She (1954)
 The Barrings (1955)
 Mamitschka (1955)
 Night of Decision (1956, dir. Falk Harnack)
  (1956)
 Without You All Is Darkness (1956)
 Scandal in Bad Ischl (1957)
 Confessions of Felix Krull (1957, dir. Kurt Hoffmann)
 The Mad Bomberg (1957)
  (1957)
 Eva (1958)
 Rosemary (1958)
 The Man Who Sold Himself (1959, dir. Josef von Báky)
 Labyrinth (1959)
 Beloved Augustin (1960)
 You Don't Shoot at Angels (1960)
 Agatha, Stop That Murdering! (1960)
 Storm in a Water Glass (1960)
 Lulu (1962)
  (1962)
 Venusberg (1963)
 Tonio Kröger (1964)
  (1965)
 The Blood of the Walsungs (1965)
 The Gentlemen (1965)
 Who Wants to Sleep? (1965)
 Once a Greek (1966)
  (1967)
  (1968)
 The New Adventures of Snow White (1969)
 Come to Vienna, I'll Show You Something! (1970)
 Slap in the Face (1970)
  (1971)
 Temptation in the Summer Wind (1972)
 Women in Hospital (1977)

References

External links

1918 births
1994 deaths
German film directors
Film people from České Budějovice
German Bohemian people
Naturalized citizens of Germany
German film producers
20th-century German screenwriters
German male screenwriters